Ryan Gellert is the CEO of Patagonia, Inc. as of September 2020. Prior to appointment as CEO, Gellert was the manager of EMEA - Patagonia for the European market. Prior to working at Patagonia, Gellert worked 15 years at Black Diamond Equipment, where he served as president starting in 2012.

Early life and education
Gellert earned a BSBA in Finance from the University of North Carolina at Charlotte in 1994, an MBA from the Florida Institute of Technology in 1996, and a Juris Doctor from the University of Utah S.J. Quinney College of Law in 2005.

References

Year of birth missing (living people)
Living people
American chief executives of fashion industry companies
Florida Institute of Technology alumni
University of North Carolina at Charlotte alumni